Lioptilodes subantarcticus is a moth of the family Pterophoridae. It is known from Argentina and Brazil.

The wingspan is 19–21 mm. Adults are on wing in January and February.

The larvae feed on Gnaphistylis itatiatiae, Senecio juergensi, Senecio conyzaefolius, Senecio pinnatus and Senecio oleosus.

References

Platyptiliini
Moths described in 1991
Moths of South America